{{DISPLAYTITLE:C23H37NO5S}}
The molecular formula C23H37NO5S (molar mass: 439.61  g/mol) may refer to:

 Eoxin E4, or 14,15-leukotriene E4
 Leukotriene E4, or LTE4

Molecular formulas